Martti Saarinen (born 20 October 1980 in Tuusula, Finland) is a Finnish singer and the winner of the fifth series of the Idols in 2011.

In the last final of Idols Saarinen got 56% of the votes. Ali Elkharam was second. The winner's song was "Se alkaa taas". His debut album, Martti Saarinen, was released in 2011.

References

External links 
Official site

Living people
1980 births
People from Tuusula
21st-century Finnish male singers
Idols (TV series) winners